Ospitaletto-Travagliato is a railway station serving the towns of Ospitaletto and  Travagliato, in the region of Lombardy, northern Italy. The station is located on the Milan–Venice railway and Bergamo–Brescia railway. The train services are operated by Trenord.

Train services
The station is served by the following service(s):

Regional services (Treno regionale) Sesto San Giovanni - Milan - Treviglio - Brescia
Regional services (Treno regionale) Bergamo - Rovato - Brescia

See also

History of rail transport in Italy
List of railway stations in Lombardy
Rail transport in Italy
Railway stations in Italy

References

 This article is based upon a translation of the Italian language version as of January 2016.

External links

Railway stations in Lombardy